The 2016 fred's 250 Powered by Coca-Cola was the 19th stock car race of the 2016 NASCAR Camping World Truck Series, the final race of the Round of 8, and the 11th iteration of the event. The race was held on Saturday, October 22, 2016, in Lincoln, Alabama, at Talladega Superspeedway, a 2.66-mile (4.28 km) permanent tri-oval shaped superspeedway. The race took the scheduled 94 laps to complete. Grant Enfinger, driving for GMS Racing, pulled off the upset win, after holding off Spencer Gallagher on the final lap. It was Enfinger's first career NASCAR Camping World Truck Series win. To fill out the podium, Timothy Peters, driving for Red Horse Racing, would finish in 3rd, respectively.

The six drivers that advanced into the Round of 6 are William Byron, Christopher Bell, Timothy Peters, Ben Kennedy, Johnny Sauter, and Matt Crafton. Daniel Hemric and John Hunter Nemechek would be eliminated from championship contention.

Background 

Talladega Superspeedway, nicknamed “'Dega”, and formerly named Alabama International Motor Speedway (AIMS) from 1969 to 1989, is a motorsports complex located north of Talladega, Alabama. It is located on the former Anniston Air Force Base in the small city of Lincoln. A tri-oval, the track was constructed in 1969 by the International Speedway Corporation, a business controlled by the France Family. , the track hosts the NASCAR Cup Series, NASCAR Xfinity Series, NASCAR Camping World Truck Series, and ARCA Menards Series. The total peak capacity of Talladega is around 175,000 spectators, with the main grandstand capacity being about 80,000.

Entry list 

 (R) denotes rookie driver.
 (i) denotes driver who is ineligible for series driver points.

Practice

First practice 
The first practice session was held on Friday, October 21, at 12:00 pm CST, and would last for 55 minutes.

Final practice 
The final practice session was held on Friday, October 21, at 2:00 pm CST, and would last for 55 minutes.

Qualifying 
Qualifying was held on Saturday, October 22, at 9:30 am CST. Since Talladega Superspeedway is at least 1.5 miles (2.4 km) in length, the qualifying system was a single car, single lap, two round system where in the first round, everyone would set a time to determine positions 13–32. Then, the fastest 12 qualifiers would move on to the second round to determine positions 1–12.

Clay Greenfield, Jennifer Jo Cobb, Ryan Ellis, and Parker Kligerman would fail to qualify.

Full qualifying results

Race results

Standings after the race 

Drivers' Championship standings

Note: Only the first 8 positions are included for the driver standings.

References 

NASCAR races at Talladega Superspeedway
October 2016 sports events in the United States
2016 in sports in Alabama